Julia Cohen and Tatjana Maria were the defending champions, having won the event in 2013, but Maria chose not to participate in 2014. Cohen partnered Nicola Slater, but they lost in the first round.

Anett Kontaveit and Ilona Kremen won the tournament, defeating Shelby Rogers and Olivia Rogowska in the final, 6–1, 5–7, [10–5].

Seeds

Draw

References 

 Draw

Dothan Pro Tennis Classic - Doubles
Hardee's Pro Classic